William Riddet  (1896–1958) was a New Zealand university professor, scientific administrator and agricultural scientist. He was born in Dalry, Ayrshire, Scotland, in 1896.

The Riddet Institute commemorates his name. He was a foundation chair of Massey Agricultural College and is regarded as the founder of dairy science in New Zealand. He had the idea of using electric fences for dairy feed control. In the 1954 New Year Honours, Riddet was appointed a Commander of the Order of the British Empire.

References

1896 births
1958 deaths
Academic staff of the Massey University
People from North Ayrshire
British emigrants to New Zealand
New Zealand Commanders of the Order of the British Empire